John Snell (fl. 1402) of Winchester, Hampshire, was an English politician.

He was a Member (MP) of the Parliament of England for Winchester in 1402.

References

14th-century births
15th-century deaths
English MPs 1402
Politicians from Winchester